The Gold Medal of Merit in the Fine Arts is awarded by the Ministry of Culture and Sport of Spain to individuals or institutions excelling in artistic or cultural creation or to those that have provided valuable services to promotion of art and culture or to conservation of artistic heritage.

The medals were created by means of a December 1969 decree. They are bestowed on an annual basis.

Award recipients
Some award recipients include:

References

External links
 

1969 establishments in Spain
Awards established in 1969
Spanish awards